(KOF '95) is a fighting game produced by SNK for the Neo Geo arcade and home consoles in 1995. It is the sequel to The King of Fighters '94 and the second game in The King of Fighters series. It is also the first game in the series to be ported to other home consoles besides the Neo Geo AES and Neo-Geo CD thus making SNK a second-party developer, with versions released for the PlayStation, Sega Saturn and Game Boy. It was also rereleased in The King of Fighters Collection: The Orochi Saga in 2008 for the PlayStation 2, PlayStation Portable and Wii.

The game features a similar cast to KOF '94 with the exception of the USA Team, which was replaced by the Rival Team. The plot features a new King of Fighters tournament once again promoted by the criminal Rugal Bernstein, who wants to take revenge against Kyo Kusanagi, who defeated him in last year's tournament. The game also introduces a sub-boss character, Saisyu Kusanagi, who is the father of Kyo. KOF '95 also introduces the fighter Iori Yagami, who becomes Kyo's rival in the series.

One of the main focuses in the creation of The King of Fighters '95 was the introduction of the Rivals Team, most notably Iori, who became one of the favorite characters from the staff. The game has received mixed reviews from various video games publications. Most writers have complained about the response from controls and long loading times from the PlayStation port. However, the introduction from the enhanced version of Rugal, Omega Rugal, as well as the differences between all the characters have been noted to be one of the best parts from the game.

Gameplay

The gameplay and rules are mostly unchanged from The King of Fighters '94. The main addition is the introduction of the Team Edit feature, allowing the player to create a custom team from any of the game's twenty-four characters in addition to the pre-defined teams in the game. Through the main play mode, players must defeat all of the teams from the game in order to fight the bosses: the brainwashed Saisyu Kusanagi, followed by a stronger Rugal Bernstein.

Plot
The King of Fighters '95 marks the beginning of a story arc that later became known as the "Orochi Saga". However, the only elements from the Orochi Saga known in this game is the introduction of Kyo's rival, Iori Yagami, and Rugal's use of the snake demon Orochi power.

Rugal Bernstein, thought to have perished in an explosion in the previous game, had in fact survived and sent out invitations to the teams from the previous game signed simply ‘R'. Only one of the previous teams failed to attend the new tournament: the American Sports Team, now replaced by the "Rival Team" consisting of Iori Yagami, Billy Kane (from Fatal Fury: King of Fighters), and Eiji Kisaragi (from Art of Fighting 2). Saisyu Kusanagi, Kyo's father, appears as a fighter for the first time (having made a non-playable cameo in KOF '94) as a computer-controlled sub-boss character. After defeating Saisyu in the arcade mode, it is revealed that Saisyu was being brainwashed and that Rugal will fight once again as a boss character, but as an enhanced version named "Omega Rugal".

Characters

Japan Team (Hero Team)
 Kyo Kusanagi
 Benimaru Nikaido
 Goro Daimon

Fatal Fury Team
 Terry Bogard
 Andy Bogard
 Joe Higashi

Art of Fighting Team
 Ryo Sakazaki
 Robert Garcia
 Takuma Sakazaki

Ikari Warriors Team
 Heidern
 Ralf Jones
 Clark Still

Psycho Soldier Team
 Athena Asamiya
 Sie Kensou
 Chin Gentsai

Korea Team
 Kim Kaphwan
 Chang Koehan
 Choi Bounge

Women Fighters Team
 Yuri Sakazaki
 Mai Shiranui
 King

Rivals Team
 Iori Yagami (New Character)
 Billy Kane (New Character)
 Eiji Kisaragi (New Character)

Mid-Boss
 Saisyu Kusanagi (New Character)

Final Boss
 Rugal Bernstein

Development
The KOF '95 project began with the concept of introducing Iori Yagami as Kyo Kusanagi's rival. As such, developers gave him traits to expand that relationship such as similar abilities and ancient rivalry between both of their clans. During the initial location tests to determine the popularity of the game, Iori was the character who stood out most, also becoming a favorite of the developers. The creation of the Rival Team was one of the things developers worked the hardest, focusing in their moves and lines. The character of Eiji Kisaragi was originally from Art of Fighting 2 and the staff had to adjust most of his moves to balance him with the other characters. Following this game, several Art of Fighting characters were removed from each sequel with developers saying it was "thanks to KOF jinx." The sub-boss character, Saisyu Kusanagi, was never meant to appear in the game as the staff wanted to make so that he died in The King of Fighters '94 during one of the cut-scenes from the Hero Team. However, Saisyu was added at the last moment to the game, becoming the sub-boss character. Fatal Fury boss character Geese Howard was meant to be playable in the game; various considerations at the time, however, led developers to abandon this plan.

The King of Fighters '95 was one of the first titles from SNK to be ported to the Sony PlayStation system. Chad Okada, a former member from SNK, mentioned it was one of his first works. He commented that he had to improve its marketability to the North American market. As a result, he added new options to the game that were not present in the original Japanese version such as selection from stages and improve the grammar and spelling, which was one of the biggest issues from the Neo Geo version.

Release
The original Japanese arcade version was released on July 25, 1995 and it was ported to the Neo Geo and Neo-Geo CD later that year. A port of the Neo Geo release was added to Wii's Virtual Console service on April 26, 2010.  It is slightly edited, however; the blood is removed and Mai lacks her signature bounce, both in her fighting stance and win animation. Both of these aspects can be activated with a code, however.

In 1996, the game was ported to the PlayStation and Sega Saturn. The PlayStation version was published on August 31, 1996 in North America and the PAL region by Sony Computer Entertainment Inc. It featured a remixed soundtrack which took advantage of the Redbook audio format. The Saturn version (which required a ROM cartridge that came packaged with the game disc) was also released in Europe by Sega. The bundled ROM cartridge contains the majority of the character animations. It was the first video game to use a CD-ROM and a ROM cartridge in tandem. The PlayStation version appeared in Europe ahead of the Saturn version due to a timed exclusivity deal between SNK and Sony Computer Entertainment Europe. The "Playstation the Best" version was also re-released on March 28, 1997. It was also compiled in The King of Fighters Collection: The Orochi Saga in 2008 for the PlayStation 2, PlayStation Portable and Wii.

A Game Boy game based on The King of Fighters '95 (Nettō The King of Fighters '95 in Japan) was published by Takara in Japan and by Nintendo in North America. It featured compatibility with the Super Game Boy, as well as introducing Nakoruru from the Samurai Shodown series as a secret character.

A Nintendo Switch port of "The King of Fighters '95" was released worldwide on October 12, 2017.

Related media
The game received a variety of licensed media released in Japan in 1994–1995:
Original soundtrack The King of Fighters '95 (PCCB-00187) and arranged soundtrack The King of Fighters '95 Arrange Sound Trax (PCCB-00189), both released by Pony Canyon.
Guide books The King of Fighters '95 Graphical Manual (GMC-14) by Shinseisha, The King of Fighters '95 Neo Geo Hisshō Hō Special by Keibunsha, and The King of Fighters '95 Perfect Guide Book by Shinseisha.
4-koma manga collections The King of Fighters '95 4-Koma Ketteiban and The King of Fighters '95 4-Koma Ketteiban Side 2, created by fans and professional artists and published by Shinseisha.
VHS video The King of Fighters '95 by Shinseisha.
Guide/art books The King of Fighters '95: Official Guide Book for the Ultimate Fighters by Aspect and The King of Fighters '95 Complete Manual by Shinseisha.
Manga short story compilation The King of Fighters '95 Comic Anthology, created by various artists and published by Shinseisha.

Reception

Sales
In Japan, Game Machine listed The King of Fighters '95 on their September 1, 1995 issue as being the second most-successful arcade game of the month. The Neo Geo AES version sold 108,883 cartridges in its first week of release in Japan, at a price of £160–200 ( at the time, or  adjusted for inflation) per cartridge. The Neo Geo CD version also sold 142,825 copies in its first week on the market. They sold a combined 310,060 units in Japan.

During its release week, the Sega Saturn port of the game sold 135,214 copies in Japan. As of 2004, the game sold 257,294 copies. The game also sold 145,389 units for the PlayStation in Japan, adding up to a combined total of 712,743 units sold in Japan.

Critical response
Upon release, Computer and Video Games magazine called it "arguably the greatest 2D fighting game ever" made. The King of Fighters '95 was awarded Best Neo-Geo Game of 1995 by Electronic Gaming Monthly in 1996.

The four reviewers of Electronic Gaming Monthly declared the Neo Geo AES version a solid improvement over the previous King of Fighters, particularly applauding the addition of the team edit feature. Major Mike of GamePro agreed that this was the game's best feature, but also expressed approval for the replacement of the U.S. team with the new "Rival" team and the control modifications. He did criticize that the game "didn't improve '94's graphics, it just added to them", but concluded King of Fighters '95 to be "one of the best brawlers out there". A reviewer for Next Generation was unimpressed, however, remarking that "The idea behind fighting as a three-person team ... adds an interesting flare to the game, but the final result is still a one-on-one fighting game with nothing much new to offer the seasoned fighter."

Reviewing the Neo Geo CD version, Maximum deemed that "SNK remain masters of the sprite-based one-on-one fighting genre, leaving all competitors way behind with King of Fighters '95." They elaborated that the team combat makes for greater variety than the average fighting game, the team edit feature greatly increases the game's enjoyability and longevity, the unusually high difficulty of executing combos makes pulling them off more satisfying, and the animations are greatly improved from The King of Fighters '94.

The PlayStation version, however, was much less well received, as reviewers stated it has poor design in comparison to other fighting games from the same year. IGN criticized that the characters are not very responsive to controls and "even though these are difficult hurdles to jump, they're not impossible". However, they noted it to be a likeable game, saying it has "that 2D anime look that everyone loves". A reviewer for Next Generation said that the PlayStation version compounded the game's lack of fresh and original gameplay with long load times. Jeff Gerstmann from GameSpot also criticized the long loading times from the PlayStation version as well as how frequent they are since every round requires loading time. Game Revolution noted the game to be very entertaining but still not as good as other fighting games from the year it was released in North America. They criticized that the fighting system is very similar to other SNK games such as Fatal Fury and Art of Fighting. However, Scary Larry defended the PlayStation version in GamePro, saying it "plays well, looks good, and sounds the same as the arcade version. You could do worse." 1UP.com praised the introduction of Omega Rugal, noting him to be "one of the most stylish boss designs in fighting history", although players could hate him due to how difficult it is to defeat him.

Rich Leadbetter of Sega Saturn Magazine stated that the Saturn port is nearly arcade perfect, the ROM cartridge enabling it to recreate the look of the arcade version with only brief load times. He found the level of skill and technique involved in the game to be both its strongest point and the main limiting factor on its appeal: "SNK fans swear blind that King of Fighters is far superior to Street Fighter Alpha (and its sequel) simply because the element of skill required is that much tougher - making the rewards that much sweeter. The majority of us are unlikely to reach that pinnacle of skill ... but the fact is that if you're good enough, it remains one of the greatest fighting games of all time." He added that while The King of Fighters '96 was already out for the Saturn in Japan, the two installments are different enough from each other that it is worth getting both.

IGN commented that the characters' designs and abilities are very similar to the ones from Street Fighter Alpha. Jeff Gerstmann complained that the characters have unattractive moves as well and over pixelated sprites. 1UP.com praised SNK's characters designs and the addition of the team edit option, making the game a good competition for Street Fighter Alpha. However, Game Revolution liked the large number of playable characters and the several options featured in the game such as the team fights and special moves.

Game designer Masahiro Sakurai regarded the game as one of his favorite competitive experiences when being young. However, after realizing he had been defeating rookies, Sakurai decided that fighting games should also be accessible to newcomers.

Notes

References

External links 
 
 The King of Fighters '95 at GameFAQs
 The King of Fighters '95 at Giant Bomb
 The King of Fighters '95 at Killer List of Videogames
 The King of Fighters '95 at MobyGames

1995 video games
2D fighting games
ACA Neo Geo games
Arcade video games
D4 Enterprise games
Fighting games
Game Boy games
Multiplayer and single-player video games
Neo Geo games
Neo Geo CD games
Nintendo games
Nintendo Switch games
PlayStation (console) games
PlayStation Network games
PlayStation 4 games
Rutubo Games games
Sega Saturn games
SNK games
SNK Playmore games
Takara video games
The King of Fighters games
Video games scored by Masahiko Hataya
Video games scored by Yasuaki Fujita
Video games set in Brazil
Video games set in China
Video games set in England
Video games set in Italy
Video games set in Japan
Video games set in Mexico
Video games set in South Korea
Video games set in the United States
Virtual Console games
Video games developed in Japan
Xbox One games
Hamster Corporation games